Events in the year 1885 in China.

Incumbents
 Guangxu Emperor (11th year)
 Regent: Empress Dowager Cixi

Events
Sino-French War
January 3–4 - Battle of Núi Bop
February 3–13 - Lạng Sơn Campaign
February 14 - Battle of Shipu
February 23 - Battle of Đồng Đăng
March 1 - Battle of Zhenhai
March 2 - Battle of Hòa Mộc
March 23 - Battle of Phu Lam Tao
March 24 - Battle of Bang Bo (Zhennan Pass)
June 9 - Treaty of Tientsin (1885), Sino-French War ends

Births
October 30 - Song Zheyuan
Su Zhaozheng

Deaths
September 5 - Zuo Zongtang

 
Years of the 19th century in China